Nii or NII may refer to:

Initialisms
National Information Infrastructure, a telecommunications policy buzzword, coined under the Clinton Administration in the United States
National Institute of Immunology (disambiguation)
National Institute of Informatics, a Japanese research institute for the advancement of studies in informatics
National Insurance Institute of Israel (Bituah Leumi)
 ("science and research institute"), part of the Russian-language name of a large number of Soviet and post-Soviet research institutions
Necessary International Initiative, a Trotskyist political grouping formed in 1976 
Net Interest Income, a financial term
Non-Intrusive Inspection of cargo containers
Nuclear Installations Inspectorate, part of the UK Office for Nuclear Regulation
Non-Individual Investor (India), resident Indian individuals, Non-Resident Indians (NRIs), (Hindu Undivided Families (HUFs), Companies, Corporate Bodies, Scientific Institutions, Societies, and Trusts who apply for more than ₹2 lakhs of IPO shares

Places
Nii Station (Hyōgo), a train station in Asago, Hyōgo Prefecture, Japan
Nii Station (Mie), a railway station in Iga, Mie Prefecture, Japan

People
Nii Addy, American neuroscientist
Nii Addo Quaynor (born 1982), a Ghanaian rapper better known as Tinny
Nii Akuetteh, a Ghanaian policy analyst and activist
Nii Allotey Odunton, a Ghanaian politician
Nii Amaa Ollennu (1906–1986), a Ghanaian politician
Nii Amugi II (1940–2004), former king of Ghana
Nii Armah Ashitey, a Ghanaian lawyer and politician
Nii Kwaku Sowah, a Ghanaian politician
Nii Lamptey (born 1974), a former Ghanaian professional footballer
Nii Nortey Ashong (born 1994), a Ghanaian professional footballer
Nii Okaidja Adamafio, a former Ghanaian politician
Nii Okaija Adamafio, a Ghanaian politician
Nii Okwei Kinka Dowuona VI, (born 1963), King of the Ga people of Osu in Ghana
Nii Parkes (born 1974), a Ghanaian writer
Nii Plange (born 1989), a Burkinabé professional footballer
Nii Quaynor, a Ghanaian engineer
Nii Tackie Tawiah III, (1940–2012), former king of Ghana
Nii Welbeck (born 1976), a retired Ghanaian professional footballer

Other uses
Nii language, spoken in the highlands of Papua New Guinea
NII Holdings, a wireless telecommunications company with operations in Latin America, based in Reston, Virginia
 N-II (rocket), Japanese rocket based on the U.S. Thor/Delta family

See also

 N2 (disambiguation)